Daciano Colbachini (31 October 1893 – 13 April 1982) was an Italian hurdler who competed in the 1912 Summer Olympics and in the 1920 Summer Olympics. He was born in Padua.

References

External links
 

1893 births
1982 deaths
Italian male hurdlers
Olympic athletes of Italy
Athletes (track and field) at the 1912 Summer Olympics
Athletes (track and field) at the 1920 Summer Olympics
Sportspeople from Padua